Gunnar Dybwad (21 August 1928 – 9 May 2012) was a Norwegian football forward.

He was born in Steinkjer, and played for Steinkjer IFK, SK Freidig and IFK Östersund. Dybwad made his debut for Norway in a friendly game against England amateur team on 15 May 1951 and scored his first two international goal in a 2–4 loss against Yugoslavia on 23 August 1951. He was capped 27 times, scoring 11 goals. He was the first player from Nord-Trøndelag, and the first player from a club north of Trondheim to play for Norway

He died in 2012.

References

1928 births
2012 deaths
People from Steinkjer
Norwegian footballers
Norway international footballers
Eliteserien players
Norwegian expatriate footballers
Expatriate footballers in Sweden
Norwegian expatriate sportspeople in Sweden
Steinkjer FK players
IFK Östersund players
Association football forwards
Sportspeople from Trøndelag